Bury Association Football Club is a fan-owned English association football club representing the town of Bury, Greater Manchester. It was established in December 2019 as a phoenix of Bury F.C., which had recently been expelled from the English Football League (EFL). Bury AFC won the 2021–22 North West Counties Football League Division One North championship, earning promotion to the league's Premier Division for the 2022–23 season. The team play their home games at Stainton Park in nearby Radcliffe through a groundshare agreement with Radcliffe F.C.

In October 2022 supporters were urged to vote in a poll regarding a potential amalgamation of the Bury Football Club Supporters' Society (who owned Gigg Lane and the "Bury F.C." trading name) and the Shakers Community Society (who owned Bury AFC). If the merger was agreed, a new society - The Football Supporters' Society of Bury - would be formed, based at Gigg Lane, while Bury AFC would change its playing name to Bury Football Club. However, the proposals failed to reach the required 66% threshold from both societies; the Shakers Community Society voted 94% in favour while the BFCSS vote in favour fell short, at 63%. A second poll is to be held in early 2023.

History

Foundation
Crippled by mounting debts, Bury F.C. was expelled from the English Football League (EFL) on 27 August 2019 because of its inability to furnish proof of its financial viability. Although the club continued to exist, fears grew that it would be liquidated and, in December 2019, a group of supporters resolved to form a phoenix club which they named Bury Association Football Club (Bury AFC).

Some 300 Bury FC fans came forward to help and they formed a company registered as Bury Football Club (2019) Ltd (trading as Bury AFC), with its office in Rawtenstall. The club is fan-owned on the basis of one member one vote. Their motto is: "By the fans. For the fans". The new club immediately applied to the North West Counties Football League, the tenth tier of the English football league system, for membership in the 2020–21 season. The league approved the application on 21 February 2020. The club then also applied to play in the FA Vase. Membership increased and had exceeded 650 by early August 2020. It reached 1,000 in October, when the team started playing, with each member paying £5 per month.

The formation of the club was followed in the BBC podcast documentary series, Out Of Our League by journalists and Bury fans Mark Crossley and Sanny Rudravajhala for BBC Sounds.

Pre-2020-21 season events
Due to the COVID-19 pandemic, English football league competitions below the top flights were cancelled, but Bury AFC anticipated a September 2020 restart and advertised for a team manager, receiving some 750 applications. On 29 July, Ossett United manager and former Sunderland, Leicester City and Blackpool midfielder Andy Welsh was appointed as the club's first team manager. On 10 August, the club announced its first signing, Scottish midfielder Adam McWilliam, aged 25, who had spent the previous season with AFC Totton in the Southern League. The next day, Bury signed forward Liam MacDevitt, also aged 25, from Stalybridge Celtic. The draw for the first qualifying round of the 2020–21 FA Vase was completed on 19 August and Bury were drawn away against NWCFL Division One South side West Didsbury & Chorlton at Brookburn Road. On 26 August, Bury AFC played its first match, a pre-season friendly at Daisy Hill, and won 5–0.

2020–21 season
The 2020–21 season was the club's inaugural season. The FA Vase tie, played on 19 September, was the team's first competitive game, but they lost 2–1. The club's first competitive goal was a penalty scored by Greg Daniels. On 3 October, they played their first league game, at home against Steeton, and won 3–2 having been 1–2 down at the end of normal time. Tony Whitehead had scored in the first half and the match was won after Tom Greaves scored two goals in injury time.

Bury's next two matches were postponed because of local COVID-19 restrictions affecting their intended opponents, Holker Old Boys (based in Barrow-in-Furness) and Pilkington FC (based in St Helens). They played another phoenix club AFC Darwen (the successor to Darwen F.C.) at home on 17 October and won 6–2 after two goals by Aidan Chippendale and four by Tom Greaves. They took four points from the next three games to go second in the table but then the season was postponed for six weeks because of the COVID-19 lockdown restrictions then in force. The season was suspended in December, and was subsequently abandoned on 24 February 2021.

2021–22 season
In the 2021–22 season, Bury AFC played in the North West Counties Football League Division One North. On 27 March 2022, before a crowd of over 1,800 people, a 4–0 home victory over St Helens Town secured the club's promotion to the NWCFL Premier Division as divisional champions. Manager Andy Welsh praised his players for their season-long consistency.

2022–23 season
Having previously won four of their first five NWCFL Premier Division matches, Bury AFC won a televised FA Cup first qualifying round tie against North Shields 2–1, and, after beating Congleton Town and Clitheroe, were drawn at home in the fourth qualifying round to National League side York City, who beat Bury AFC 2–1 on 15 October 2022. In early February 2023, Bury AFC were fifth in the NWCFL Premier Division, and had reached the quarter-finals of the FA Vase after a 2–1 win at Tring Athletic. On 11 March 2023, Bury AFC lost the quarter-final against Congleton Town after a penalty shoot-out following a 1–1 draw.

Proposed merger with Bury FC 
In May 2022, the Bury FC Supporters Society signed a memorandum of understanding (MoU) regarding the future of the club, with the Shakers Community Society on behalf of Bury AFC among the signatories. The MoU set out objectives including bringing professional football back to Bury, and uniting and growing the fan base. In July 2022, Bury fans were asked to back a merger of the two principal supporters' groups (BFCSS and the Shakers Community Society) to bring professional football back to Gigg Lane. However, continued tensions between Bury FC and Bury AFC hampered progress. A Bury FC fans protest against the merger led to games at Radcliffe Juniors FC's playing fields being cancelled on 3 September 2022, while a 12-year old girl and a player were injured after a flare was thrown at Stainton Park during Bury AFC's FA Cup first qualifying round tie against North Shields on the same day, though it was unclear if this incident was linked to the protest.

Local football supporters were urged to vote in a poll, facilitated by the Football Supporters' Association, regarding a potential merger of BFCSS (who owned Gigg Lane and the Bury FC name) and the Shakers Community Society (who owned Bury AFC). Warned by the FSA that there was no "viable and sustainable alternative to the merger", the two groups both recommended their members to vote in favour. If the merger was agreed at special meetings on 28 October and 11 November, a new society - The Football Supporters' Society of Bury - would be formed, based at Gigg Lane, while Bury AFC would change its playing name to Bury Football Club. However, the proposals failed to reach the required 66% threshold from both societies; the Shakers Community Society voted 94% in favour while the BFCSS vote in favour fell short, at 63%. Within hours of the vote being declared on 28 October 2022, Bury MBC announced it would "now not be making that [£450,000] funding available", but remained "happy to have further discussions with all concerned parties on the way forward".

In March 2023, a second poll regarding a merger between Bury FC and Bury AFC was announced. BFCSS's Daniel Bowerbank talked about uniting the "broken fanbase", adding: "We've got a team with no stadium and then the other side with a stadium but no football team." Bury AFC's Phil Young said: "This is really the only way forward for us."

Ground
In 2020, there was no possibility of the new club playing its matches at Gigg Lane, home of Bury FC, and a groundshare was agreed with Radcliffe FC for the 2020–21 NWCFL season, so the team's home venue is Stainton Park (currently called the Neuven Stadium for sponsorship reasons) in Radcliffe, which is about 2.5 miles (4 km) south-west of Bury. The ground has a capacity of 4,000 with 350 seats.

Bury AFC enquired about renting Gigg Lane but the request was rejected on 5 April 2022 as "not feasible" by the Bury FC Supporters Society who cited commercial risks and imbalances that could jeopardise a future merger with Bury AFC.

Players

Current squad

Source:

 (3rd captain)

Officials and staff

Honours

League championships
North West Counties Football League
 Division One North (1) 2021–22

Rivalries
Bury AFC being a new club, supporters of the old Bury F.C. have considered Bolton Wanderers F.C, Rochdale A.F.C and Oldham Athletic to be their main rivals together with Accrington Stanley and Wigan Athletic, amongst other fringe rivals. However, meetings between clubs are limited to pre-season friendlies due to Bury AFC’s position lower in the football pyramid.

References

External links
 Official website of the North West Counties Football League

2019 establishments in England
Association football clubs established in 2019
Fan-owned football clubs in England
Football clubs in England
Football clubs in the Metropolitan Borough of Bury
North West Counties Football League clubs
Phoenix clubs (association football)